The Review of Communication is a peer-reviewed online academic journal which is published by Taylor & Francis on behalf of the National Communication Association. The Review of Communication publishes original scholarship that supposedly "advances the discipline and practice of communication through the study of major themes that cross disciplinary subfields".

Abstracting and indexing 
The journal is abstracted and indexed in

 Communication and Mass Media Complete
 Current Abstracts

Communication journals
Education journals
Quarterly journals
Taylor & Francis academic journals
English-language journals
Publications established in 2003